National Metallurgical Laboratory is an Indian research center that functions under the aegis of Council of Scientific and Industrial Research.

History 
In 1944, the then Government released  to set up National Physical Laboratory, National Chemical Laboratory and National Metallurgical Laboratory (NML). This was seen as a step by the Government to develop industry in pre-independent India, and also as an incentive to private firms to support industrial research. As a result, the Tata Trust promised to donate  to NML. A year later, Ardeshir Dalal – the then member of planning and development for the government – confirmed the location of NML to be Jamshedpur. In 1946, the governing body approved the final plans for NML.

On 21 November 1946, Honorable Mr. C. Rajagopalachari laid the foundation stone of the laboratory in front of representatives from the iron and steel industry. Dr. George Sachs, an American metallurgist was appointed as the first director of the laboratory. Since October 1949, the technological block of the laboratory started functioning effectively. On 26 November 1950, the country's first prime minister Pandit Jawaharlal Nehru inaugurated the laboratory. This was followed by a two-day conference that was held in the presence of the directors of National Physical Laboratory, National Chemical Laboratory, Central Road Research Laboratory, Fuel Research Institute, NML and Central Glass and Ceramic Research Laboratory. The conference noted the essential articles that were not produced in the country, but will be required during emergencies.

References

External links
 

Research institutes in Jharkhand
Council of Scientific and Industrial Research
Metallurgical industry in India
Education in Jamshedpur
1946 establishments in India
Research institutes established in 1946